Ryan Glenn (born June 7, 1980) is a Canadian professional ice hockey defenceman who currently plays for EC VSV of the Austrian Hockey League (EBEL). He was selected by the Montreal Canadiens in the 5th round (145th overall) of the 2000 NHL Entry Draft. After playing his second season in the EBEL in 2016–17 with HC Bolzano, Glenn left as a free agent to continue in the league on a one-year deal with EC VSV on May 2, 2017.

Career statistics

Awards and honours

References

External links

1980 births
Living people
Alaska Aces (ECHL) players
Bolzano HC players
Charlotte Checkers (1993–2010) players
Hartford Wolf Pack players
Ilves players
JYP Jyväskylä players
KalPa players
Lowell Lock Monsters players
Milwaukee Admirals players
Montreal Canadiens draft picks
Oulun Kärpät players
Peoria Rivermen (AHL) players
Providence Bruins players
St. Lawrence Saints men's ice hockey players
SaiPa players
EC Red Bull Salzburg players
Södertälje SK players
HC Sparta Praha players
Syracuse Crunch players
IF Troja/Ljungby players
EC VSV players
Wilkes-Barre/Scranton Penguins players
Canadian expatriate ice hockey players in the Czech Republic
Canadian expatriate ice hockey players in Austria
Canadian expatriate ice hockey players in Italy
Canadian expatriate ice hockey players in Finland
Canadian expatriate ice hockey players in Sweden
Canadian ice hockey defencemen
Canadian expatriate ice hockey players in the United States
Canadian expatriate ice hockey players in Hungary
Canadian expatriate ice hockey players in Slovakia
Canadian expatriate ice hockey players in Poland
People from Port Coquitlam
Ice hockey people from British Columbia
Fehérvár AV19 players
EHC Lustenau players
TH Unia Oświęcim players
HC '05 Banská Bystrica players